Bakla ezmesi, also known as Fava, is a traditional Turkish food that is nutrient-dense and flavorful. It is made of yellow split peas, onion, garlic, extra virgin olive oil, and lemon. It can also contain favetta, or fava bean puree. Fava beans, also known as broad beans, are one of the world's oldest cultivated plants.

Bakla ezmesi is a meze, or Mediterranean appetizer, prepared by soaking and boiling shelled, dried broad beans until they become soft and then puréeing them with olive oil. Fresh dill can be added to the mix. The purée is left to set overnight, served cold, and garnished with dill and lemon slices.

See also

 Msabbaha
 Hummus

References

Appetizers
Turkish cuisine
Cretan Turks cuisine